The men's snowboard cross competition in snowboarding at the 2022 Winter Olympics was held on 10 February, at the Genting Snow Park in Zhangjiakou. Alessandro Hämmerle of Austria became the champion. Éliot Grondin of Canada won the silver medal, and Omar Visintin of Italy the bronze. For all of them, this was the first Olympic medal.

Summary
The 2014 and 2018 champion, Pierre Vaultier, retired from competitions. The 2018 silver medalist, Jarryd Hughes, qualified for the Olympics. The bronze medalist, Regino Hernández, did not qualify and retired as professional rider in January 2022. At the 2021–22 FIS Snowboard World Cup, six snowboard cross events were held before the Olympics. Martin Nörl was leading the ranking, followed by Alessandro Hämmerle and Jakob Dusek. Lucas Eguibar is the 2021 world champion, with Hämmerle and Éliot Grondin being the silver and bronze medalists, respectively.

Qualification

A total of 32 snowboarders qualified to compete at the games. For an athlete to compete they must have a minimum of 100.00 FIS points on the FIS Points List on January 17, 2022 and a top 30 finish in a World Cup event or at the FIS Snowboard World Championships 2021. A country could enter a maximum of four athletes into the event.

Results

Seeding run
The seeding run was held at 11:15.

Elimination round

1/8 finals

Heat 1

Heat 2

Heat 3

Heat 4

Heat 5

Heat 6

Heat 7

Heat 8

Quarterfinals

Heat 1

Heat 2

Heat 3

Heat 4

Semifinals

Heat 1

Heat 2

Finals
Small final

Big final

References

Men's snowboarding at the 2022 Winter Olympics